Ravensbourne is a national park in Ravensbourne and Buaraba in South East Queensland, Australia, 33 km west of Esk. It is a small scenic park on the Great Dividing Range within the Lockyer Creek water catchment area and  overlooking the Lockyer Valley. Small remnants of the rainforest and wet eucalypt forest that once covered this part of the Great Dividing Range are preserved in Ravensbourne National Park. Red soils of the park's west and south-west support rainforest that includes eucalypt species as well as palms, vines and ferns. Sandy soils of the park's eastern section support open eucalypt forest. The park is situated in the water catchment areas of the Brisbane River and Lockyer Creek.

Fauna
A total of four rare or threatened species have been recorded in the park.  More than 80 species of birds have been recorded in the park.

See also

 Protected areas of Queensland

References

External links

National parks of South East Queensland
Protected areas established in 1922
1922 establishments in Australia